Sir Brendan Paul Barber (born 3 April 1951) is a British trade union official. He served as chair of the Advisory, Conciliation and Arbitration Service (ACAS) Council until 2020. He is a former general secretary of the United Kingdom's Trades Union Congress (TUC); a post he held from June 2003 until his retirement at the end of 2012. He was appointed Acas Chair in 2014, replacing Ed Sweeney, who had been in the post since 2007.  He also serves on the board of the Banking Standards Board (2015–), the Board of Transport for London (2013–), the board of Britain Stronger in Europe (2015–), the Council of City University, London and the board of Mountview Academy of Theatre Arts (2014–).

Early life
Born in Southport, Lancashire, Barber was educated at St Mary's College, Sefton (then a direct grant grammar school). Between school and university, he spent a year with VSO teaching in the Volta Region of Ghana. At City University London, he earned a BA hons in social sciences in 1974, then spent the next year as the president of the students' union.

Career
He spent a year as a researcher for the Ceramics, Glass and Mineral Products Industry Training Board based in Harrow.

TUC
In 1975. he began working at the TUC as a policy officer. In 1979, he became the head of the TUC's Press and Information Department.
In 1987, he became head of the Organisation and Industrial Relations Department and in 1993 he became deputy general secretary.

He became General Secretary of the TUC in June 2003. On 18 April 2012, he announced his retirement, enabling a successor to be elected in September at Trades Union Congress 2012. Frances O'Grady was elected his successor.

Awards

In 2007, Barber was given an Award of Doctor of Science honoris causa by City University London. He was knighted in the 2013 Birthday Honours for services to employment relations.

Personal life
He met Mary Gray in the TUC International Dept, and they married. They have two daughters. He supports Everton F.C. and lives in Muswell Hill.

References

External links
 TUC
 Guardian profile September 2003
 Bank of England Court of Directors
 
 "Christmas spending 'will be tough'" 16 November 2011, Budget Planning News

1951 births
Living people
Alumni of City, University of London
Fellows of Nuffield College, Oxford
General Secretaries of the Trades Union Congress
Knights Bachelor
People from Southport
People educated at St Mary's College, Crosby